Abbott's Creek Primitive Baptist Church Cemetery is a historic Primitive Baptist church cemetery near Thomasville, Davidson County, North Carolina.

There are approximately 450 gravestones, with the earliest headstone dating to 1795. Around one dozen unmarked field stones may date even earlier. The 351 locally manufactured gravestones makes it the largest such group in Davidson County, North Carolina. All of the epitaphs are inscribed in English because of the English and Scotch-Irish settlers who were members of the church. This was in spite of the headstones being cut by local German stonecutters.

It was listed on the National Register of Historic Places in 1984.

References

External links
 
  – a different nearby cemetery with a similar name

Baptist cemeteries in the United States
Cemeteries on the National Register of Historic Places in North Carolina
Cemeteries in Davidson County, North Carolina
English-American culture in North Carolina
Scotch-Irish American culture in North Carolina
National Register of Historic Places in Davidson County, North Carolina
Primitive Baptists